Tiezzi is an Italian surname. Notable people with the surname include:

 Andrea Tiezzi (born 1964), Argentine tennis player
 Augusto Tiezzi (1910–1990), Italian cinematographer
 Clara Tiezzi (born 1999), Brazilian actress

See also
 Trezzi

Italian-language surnames